A Gerber multitool is a compact Multi-tool made by Gerber Legendary Blades, part of the Fiskars Corporation.

There are similarities and differences between the Gerber multitool and tools made by Leatherman. Some of the Gerber tools are accessed by opening the handles, but no longer unique to Gerber is a system in which the pliers slide straight out from the end. The sliding Safe-T-Loc system (similar to the Blackie Collins "Bolt Action" lock) locks each tool securely in place.

Different sizes of Gerber tool are available, with various combinations of components from the mundane (screwdrivers) to the esoteric (demolition detonator crimps), and from the key-chain sized, like the "Shortcut" to hefty,  models like the "Diesel".

The company is based in Portland, Oregon, USA. It was acquired by Fiskars in 1986.  Portland remains the headquarters of the Finnish company's outdoor recreation group.

Gallery

See also 
 Leatherman
 Victorinox
 Wenger

References

External links
 Official Gerber Legendary Blades website

Mechanical hand tools